The men's 4 × 100 metre medley relay competition at the 1997 Pan Pacific Swimming Championships took place on August 13 at the NISHI Civic Pool.  The last champion was the United States.

Records
Prior to this competition, the existing world and Pan Pacific records were as follows:

Results
All times are in minutes and seconds.

Heats
Heats weren't performed, as only seven teams had entered.

Final 
The final was held on August 13.

References

4 × 100 metre medley relay
1997 Pan Pacific Swimming Championships